This is a list of all the banks currently incorporated in Ecuador and some defunct banks.

Central bank
 Central Bank of Ecuador

Private-sector banks
 Banco Amazonas
 Banco Bolivariano
 Banco Cofiec
 Banco Comercial de Manabí
 Banco de Guayaquil
 Banco de Loja
 Banco de Machala
 Banco del Austro
 Banco del Litoral
 Banco del Pacífico
 Banco Pichincha
 Banco Delbank
 Banco General Rumiñahui
 Banco Internacional
 Banco Finca
 ProCredit Bank
 Produbanco
 Banco Solidario
 Banco Sudamericano
 Citibank Ecuador
 Banco Promérica
 Banco Coopnacional
 Banco D-Miro
 Banco Capital

Most profitable banks
According to the Ecuadorian Superintendency of Banks, as of 2012, the ten most profitable banks in Ecuador were (ordered by profit): Banco Pichincha, Banco del Pacífico, Banco de Guayaquil, Produbanco, Banco Internacional and Banco Bolivariano, Banco del Austro, Banco Solidario, Citibank Ecuador and Unibanco (now merged with Banco Solidario).

Preference polls
A poll conducted by Advance Consultora in 2012 found that clients considered the best banks in the country were (ordered by preference): Banco Internacional, Produbanco, Banco del Pacífico, Banco Pichincha, Banco de Machala and Banco de Guayaquil.

Defunct banks
 Filanbanco (closed in 2001, when it was Ecuador's biggest bank)
 Banco Comercial y Agrícola de Guayaquil (closed in 1925)
 Banco de la Previsora (closed in 1999)
 Banco de Préstamos (closed in 1998)
 Banco del Progreso (closed in 1999)
 Banco Territorial (closed in 2013)
 Unibanco (merged with Banco Solidario in 2013)

See also
 Banking in Ecuador

References 

 
Banks
Ecuador
Ecuador